Réal Gaston Lemieux (January 3, 1945 – October 24, 1975) was a Canadian ice hockey right wing. He played in the National Hockey League for the Detroit Red Wings, Los Angeles Kings, New York Rangers and Buffalo Sabres between 1967 and 1974.

Early life

Lemieux was born in Victoriaville, Quebec. He played junior for the Lachine Maroons and the Hamilton Red Wings from 1962 until 1965.

Professional career

Lemieux turned professional with the Detroit Red Wings, playing several seasons with their minor league teams, and one game with Detroit. Lemieux was claimed by Los Angeles in the 1967 NHL Expansion Draft and became a regular with the Kings. Lemieux was traded to the New York Rangers in 1969 but was re-acquired after playing 55 games with the Rangers. In 1973–74, Lemieux played for the Kings, Rangers and Sabres. In his NHL career, the vast majority of which was spent with Los Angeles, Lemieux played in 483 games, scoring 51 goals and adding 104 assists.

Retirement and death

After being cut by the Sabres in 1974, Lemieux decided to retire and joined a steel company in Sorel, Quebec. In October 1975, he developed a blood clot in his brain and died on October 24 of that year.

Career statistics

Regular season and playoffs

External links

References

1945 births
1975 deaths
Buffalo Sabres players
Canadian ice hockey right wingers
Detroit Red Wings players
Hamilton Red Wings (OHA) players
Ice hockey people from Quebec
Los Angeles Kings players
New York Rangers players
People from Victoriaville
Springfield Kings players